Stuart Fitzrandolph Merrill (August 1, 1863 in Hempstead, New York – December 1, 1915 in Versailles, France) was an American poet, who wrote mostly in the French language.  He belonged to the Symbolist school. His principal books of poetry were Les Gammes (1887), Les Fastes (1891), and Petits Poèmes d'Automne (1895).

Life

Merrill was the product of a conservative, wealthy, Protestant upbringing. In 1866, his father George received a diplomatic appointment to Paris, where Merrill would learn French and live for the next 19 years. Stéphane Mallarmé was one of Merrill's school instructors. His classmates included future symbolists René Ghil and Pierre Quillard. Merrill ran a weekly journal, Le fou, before returning to the States in 1884 to attend law school.  On April 15, 1887, Merrill went to Madison Square Theater in New York to hear Walt Whitman give his famous "Death of Abraham Lincoln" lecture. Afterwards, Merrill had the opportunity to meet Whitman, an experience he later recorded in the magazine "Le Masque."

Also in 1887, Merrill published his first book of poems, Les gammes, in Paris, and received wide critical acclaim in Europe. As his literary career took off he participated in radical political causes, siding with the anarchists in the famous Haymarket riots.  When George Bernard Shaw attempted to circulate a petition in London calling for the release of Oscar Wilde, imprisoned for homosexuality, Merrill made a similar attempt to get notable artists and intellectuals to sign a similar petition in the United States.  Although Merrill's father disinherited him for his politics, his mother would continue to support him financially throughout his life.

In 1890, Merrill published Pastels in Prose, a collection of his translations of French prose poems. This was his only book to be published in America during his lifetime. The same year, he returned to Europe permanently and he married in 1891. For the years 1893–1908, his address was 53 Quai de Bourbon, Île Saint-Louis, Paris.     Several more books, including Les fastes in 1891 and Petits poèmes d’automne in 1895, were published before his death of heart disease in 1915.    In 1927 a small traffic way in the 17th arrondissement of Paris took the name Place Stuart-Merrill.

Works
 Les gammes (The Ranges), Vanier, Paris, 1887
 Pastels en Prose, Harper & Brothers, New York, 1890
 Les Fastes (The Record), 1891
 Petits Poèmes d'Automne (Little Autumnal Poems), 1895
 Les quatre saisons (The Four Seasons), Mercure de France, Paris, 1900
 Walt Whitman, Henry S. Saunders, 1922
 Prose et vers : œuvres posthumes (Prose and Verse: Posthumous Works), A. Messein, Paris, 1925
 The White Tomb: Selected Writing, Talisman House, 1999

References

External links

 
 
 
 Poems by Stuart Merrill
 Selected poems (in French)
 

1863 births
1915 deaths
People from Hempstead (village), New York
French-language poets
American male poets
American poets in French
American writers in French
Symbolist poets
French–English translators
19th-century translators
19th-century American male writers